Sahajatri was a Bengali drama film directed by Agradoot. This movie was released on 10 March 1951 under the banner of M. P. Productions Pvt. Ltd. The music direction was done by Rabin Chattopadhyay. This movie stars Uttam Kumar, Molina Devi, Bharati Devi, Sabitri Chatterjee and Kamal Mitra in the lead roles. First time Uttam Kumar appeared to this name and kept it permanently from change to Arup Kumar. Unfortunately the film was disappointed in the box office

Plot

Cast
 Uttam Kumar
 Bharati Devi
 Gouri Shankar Panda
 Goutam Mukhopadhyay
 Haridhan Mukhopadhyay
 Jahar Gangopadhyay
 Kamal Mitra
 Sabitri Chatterjee
 Karabi Gupta 
 Molina Devi
 Probha Debi
 Panchanan Bhattacharya

Soundtrack

For the first time Hemanta Mukherjee sang on Uttam Kumar'z lip. There pair was become most popular from mid 50s and to be continued to Uttam's rest of career.

References

External links
 

1951 films
Bengali-language Indian films
1951 drama films
1950s Bengali-language films
Indian drama films